Erronea caurica, common name the thick-edged cowry, is a species of sea snail, a cowry, a marine gastropod mollusk in the family Cypraeidae, the cowries.

Subspecies
The following subspecies are recognized :
 Erronea caurica algida Bozzetti, 2018
 Erronea caurica blaesa Iredale, 1939
 Erronea caurica caurica (Linnaeus, 1758)
 Erronea caurica chrismeyeri Lorenz, 2017
 Erronea caurica dracaena (Born, 1778)
 Erronea caurica elongata (Perry, 1811)
 Erronea caurica insolita Bozzetti, 2017
 Erronea caurica mayottensis Vachon & Verneau, 2017 (synonym of Erronea caurica quinquefasciata (Röding, 1798))
 Erronea caurica nabeqensis Heiman & Mienis, 2000
 Erronea caurica quinquefasciata (Röding, 1798)
 Erronea caurica samoensis Lorenz, 2002
 Erronea caurica thachi F. Huber, 2020

Description
 These cowries reach  of length. Their shape is elongated and the basic color is light brown or yellowish, with a pinkish underside and brown spots on the edge.

Distribution
The species and its subspecies are distributed in the Red Sea and in the Indian Ocean along Aldabra, Chagos, the Comores, East Africa, Kenya, Madagascar, the Mascarene Basin, Mauritius, Mozambique, Réunion, the Seychelles, Somalia and Tanzania.

References

 Verdcourt, B. (1954). The cowries of the East African Coast (Kenya, Tanganyika, Zanzibar and Pemba). Journal of the East Africa Natural History Society 22(4) 96: 129–144, 17 pls.
 Lorenz F. (2002) New worldwide cowries. Descriptions of new taxa and revisions of selected groups of living Cypraeidae (Mollusca: Gastropoda). Schriften zur Malakozoologie aus dem Haus der Natur-Cismar 20: 1–292, pls 1-40
 Lorenz F. (2017). A new subspecies of Erronea caurica (Linnaeus 1758) from West Thailand (Gastropoda: Cypraeidae). Acta Conchyliorum. 16: 29-37

External links
 Linnaeus, C. (1758). Systema Naturae per regna tria naturae, secundum classes, ordines, genera, species, cum characteribus, differentiis, synonymis, locis. Editio decima, reformata [10th revised edition], vol. 1: 824 pp. Laurentius Salvius: Holmiae

caurica
Gastropods described in 1758
Taxa named by Carl Linnaeus